Credneria  is an extinct genus in the family or Platanaceae of broad-leaf trees similar to extinct Platanus species that appeared during the Cretaceous. The genus was first described by Zenker (1833) and has formerly been placed in the family Salicaceae rather than Platanaceae on occasion.  Credneria leaves are preserved in sandstone and less often in siltstone. The leaves are typically obovate with a pinnate-actinodromous venation and distinct suprabasal veins.

Species
Known species are:

Credneria biloba
Credneria bohemica
Credneria comparabilis 
Credneria cuneifolia
Credneria daturaefolia (Ward) 
Credneria denticulata 
?Credneria grewiopsoides 
Credneria integerrima
?Credneria longifolia
Credneria pachyphylla
Credneria parva
Credneria prophylloides (Knowlton)
Credneria pulchra
?Credneria spatiosa
Credneria subserrata (Hampe)
Credneria subtriloba
Credneria sudanense
Credneria triacuminata (Hampe)

The species Crednetia basinervosa (Hollick), C. elegans (Hollick), C. inordinata (Hollick), C. intermedia (Hollick), C. mixta(Hollick), and C.  truncatodenticulata (Bell) have all been identified as junior synonyms of the platanaceous species Pseudoprotophyllum boreale.  The species Credneria grewiopsoides (Hollick), C. longifolia (Hollick) and C. spatiosa (Hollick) from the Cenomanian Melozi and Kaltag formations along the Yukon River in Alaska are also possibly representatives of Pseudoprotophyllum boreale, but the known fossil material for the species was considered to incomplete to make a determination.

References

Cretaceous plants
Platanaceae
Salicaceae
Fossil record of plants